Jo Fraser (born 12 December 1986) is a Scottish painter. She won the BP Portrait Award Travel Award 2011 in London.

Biography 

Jo Fraser is a Scottish Portrait Artist, most notably winning The BP Portrait Travel Award at The BP Portrait Award exhibition 2011 in London.  Following her BP Travel Award win, Fraser spent two months in Peru, within an indigenous community of Quechua weavers in the small, mountainous village of Patacancha.  Her work from this time was exhibited in London at The BP Portrait Award exhibition 2012.

Fraser was educated at George Watson's College and later received a first class Honours degree in BA Fine Art from Duncan of Jordanstone College of Art and Design. 

In 2011, Fraser was commissioned by Harvey Nichols for The Elephant Family charity to design and paint a sculpture for The exhibition Edinburgh Jungle City, which was displayed above the front canopy of the Edinburgh Harvey Nichols Store.   She designed and executed a Faberge egg for The Big Faberge Egg Hunt 2014 in NYC, which was exhibited in Bryant Park.

Awards, bursaries and television appearances

 2014 Elizabeth Greenshields Foundation Award
 2012 Elizabeth Greenshields Foundation Award
 2011 BP Portrait Travel Award Winner
 2011 BP Portrait Award Exhibitor, National Portrait Gallery, London
 2011 Artist In Residence, Edinburgh Academy, Edinburgh
 2010 Elizabeth Greenshields Foundation Award 2010
 2008 Ian Eadie Award, Duncan of Jordanstone College of Art and Design
 2008 Short-listed for The Boundary Gallery Figurative Art Prize
 2006 ITV Scotland, 'A Brush With Fame: The search for Britain's best portrait painter'
 2004 Senior Bursary Award in The Creative Arts, Edinburgh
 2004 The Robert Paterson Prize, GWC
 2003 The John Gray Memorial Prize, GWC
 2002 The London Watsonian Club Prize, GWC
 2001 The Robert Merson Prize, GWC

References

External links
 BP Portrait Award success for Edinburgh artist

1986 births
Living people
Artists from Edinburgh
21st-century Scottish painters
People educated at George Watson's College
Alumni of the University of Dundee
Scottish women painters
21st-century British women artists